Court Martial is an ITC Entertainment and Roncom Productions co-production crime drama TV series that premiered in 1966.

Premise
Set during World War II, the series details the investigations of a Judge Advocate General's office.

Cast

Main cast
 Peter Graves....Major Frank Whittaker
 Bradford Dillman....Capt. David Young
 Kenneth J. Warren....M/Sgt. John MacCaskey
 Diane Clare.....Sgt. Wendy

Guest cast
 Judi Dench
 Joan Hackett
 Dennis Hopper
 Sal Mineo

Production
The series ran for one 26-episode season, with each episode being 60 minutes.  The series was shown on ABC in the United States and ITV (TV network) in the UK. It won the 1966 British Society of Film and Television (later known as BAFTA) TV award for Best Dramatic Series.

The series had its genesis in a two-part episode of NBC's Kraft Suspense Theatre (also starring Peter Graves and Bradford Dillman), "The Case Against Paul Ryker" [10–17 October 1963], which was later re-edited into a 1968 theatrical feature, Sergeant Ryker.

Directors of individual episodes included Sam Wanamaker and British TV stalwart Peter Graham Scott.

Episode list
"La Belle France"
"A Date with Celeste"
"Flight of the Tiger"
"No Wreath for an Angel"
"The Liberators"
"Operation Makeshift"
"Vengeance Is Mine"
"Without Spear or Word"
"Saviour of Vlarik"
"Where There Was No Echo"
"All Is a Dream to Me"
"The House Where He Lives"
"Let Slip the Dogs of War"
"Judge Them Gently"
"Operation Trojan Horse"
"Taps for the Sergeant"
"Redress of Wrongs"
"The Bitter Wind"
"Achilles Heel"
"All Roads Lead to Callaghan"
"Let No Man Speak"
"Silence Is the Enemy"
"How Ethical Can You Be"
"Shadow of a Man"
"The Logistics of Survival"
"Retreat from Life"

External links
"Action TV" page
 

British crime television series
British drama television series
British military television series
Television series by ITC Entertainment
ITV television dramas
American Broadcasting Company original programming
American legal drama television series
American military television series
Courts-martial in fiction
World War II television drama series
Television series produced at Pinewood Studios
Television series by Universal Television
1966 British television series debuts
1966 British television series endings
1960s British drama television series
Courtroom drama television series
Military courtroom dramas
English-language television shows